Susanna Maria Benade (born 16 February 1982) is a South African cricketer who plays as a right-handed batter and right-arm medium-fast bowler for Northern Cape. She appeared in one Test match, 29 One Day Internationals and 19 Twenty20 Internationals for South Africa between 2005 and 2013. She has previously played domestic cricket for Free State.

References

External links
 
 

1982 births
Living people
People from Lichtenburg
South African women cricketers
South Africa women Test cricketers
South Africa women One Day International cricketers
South Africa women Twenty20 International cricketers
Free State women cricketers
Northern Cape women cricketers
20th-century South African women
21st-century South African women